Alexander Struthers Finlay (20 July 1807 – 9 June 1886) was a Scottish Liberal Party politician who served as the Member of Parliament (MP) for Argyllshire 1857–68.

He was a Deputy Lieutenant for Argyllshire and Buteshire and a magistrate. He was the son of Kirkman Finlay, MP for Glasgow.

His son, Alexander Kirkman Finlay, married Nora Robinson, the daughter of Sir Hercules Robinson, then Governor of New South Wales, in one of the most celebrated weddings of colonial Australia.

References

External links 

1807 births
1886 deaths
Members of the Parliament of the United Kingdom for Scottish constituencies
Scottish Liberal Party MPs
UK MPs 1857–1859
UK MPs 1859–1865
UK MPs 1865–1868
Deputy Lieutenants of Argyll and Bute
Place of birth missing